"It's Late" is a song written by Queen guitarist Brian May and performed by the band for their 1977 album, News of the World.

Background
The song was May's idea of treating a song as a three-act theatrical play, and the verses are called "acts" in the lyrics sheet. It makes use of the tapping technique a few months before Eddie Van Halen's use of the tapping technique on the Van Halen album. May told Guitar Player Magazine that his use of the tapping technique was inspired by Texas guitarist Rocky Athas, after seeing one of his performances at Mother Blues, a Dallas club.

The lyrics describe a love affair that is on the verge of ending.

According to Billboard, the music of the single version "shifts gear from subdued balladry to thunderous rock'n'roll."  Cash Box said that "Brian May's guitar work excellently [complements] Freddie Mercury’s embracing vocals." Record World called it a "thundering rocker [that] has quiet passages and a good melody, then roars through the choruses."

Release
The song was released as a single in North America, Japan and New Zealand in 1978, albeit in heavily edited form, and peaked at #74 on the U.S. Billboard Hot 100 and #66 on the Cash Box Top 100.  The song was later included on the Queen Rocks compilation in 1997.

Personnel
Freddie Mercury - lead and backing vocals
Brian May - electric guitar, backing vocals
Roger Taylor - drums, backing vocals
John Deacon - bass guitar

References

External links
 Lyrics at Queen official website (from Queen Rocks)

Queen (band) songs
Hard rock ballads
1978 singles
Songs written by Brian May
Song recordings produced by Mike Stone (record producer)
EMI Records singles
Elektra Records singles
Hollywood Records singles
British blues rock songs
1977 songs
British hard rock songs